Visual journalism is the practice of strategically combining words and images to convey information.

Universal
Visual journalism is premised upon the idea that at a time of accelerating change, often words cannot keep pace with concepts. Visual journalism incorporates ancient symbols that resonate with humans across cultures and time and conveys meaning instantaneously at a deep level. Visual journalism is an outgrowth of the practice of graphic facilitation and recording that began entering corporate board rooms, conferences, and think tank meetings in the 1970s with the leadership of David Sibbet, founder of The Grove Consultants International. But its roots date back to ancient cave paintings and carry forward in the work of designers, architects, and engineers. Only recently has interactive visualization of this sort moved out into common use in a variety of group engagements. The scholarly father of this visual form of communication is Robert Horn, Ph.D., a fellow at Stanford University and author of the book Visual Language.

Meaning is suggested
Visual journalism is not a series of symbols with precise meanings but rather images that suggest complex meanings and, in the Egyptian tradition of the cartouche, contain words. The symbols do not simply represent but participate in the meaning and, in combination with evocative phrases, are designed to provoke creative thinking. Visual language is one tool described by author Daniel Pink in his book A Whole New Mind for the emerging "conceptual age" where people must tolerate ambiguity and communicate quickly, often before concepts are ready to be captured in traditional writing.

Projects 
2015, "People's Republic of Bolzano", Free University of Bozen-Bolzano

2016, "Europa Dreaming", Free University of Bozen-Bolzano

2021, "Glocal Climate Change", European Data Journalism Network and Sheldon.studio

Further reading

See also

Broadcast journalism
Photojournalism
Video journalism
News design

External links

Visual Editors - A social network of visual journalists
Society for News Design - A trade organization for newspaper designers
National Press Photographers Association  - Industry trade group for photojournalists
Visual Journalism platform - Free university of Bozen-Bolzano

 
Types of journalism